Nancy Kollmann (born 1950) is an American historian and William H. Bonsall Professor in History at Stanford University. She is known for her works on the history of Russia.

Books
 The Russian Empire 1450-1801 (2017)
 Crime and Punishment in Early Modern Russia (2012)

References

External links

Living people
21st-century American historians
Stanford University faculty
1950 births
American women historians
Middlebury College alumni
Harvard Graduate School of Arts and Sciences alumni
Historians of Russia